Stockwellia is a monotypic genus in the flowering plant family Myrtaceae. The sole species in the genus, Stockwellia quadrifida (commonly known as Vic Stockwell's puzzle), is endemic to Queensland.

Description

Discovery
This species first became known to botanical science in 1971, when Atherton resident Keith Gould began experimenting with aerial photography as a means of forestry interpretation. Some of his photos appeared to show a large group of emergent trees in a small patch of rainforest near Topaz, and he referred them to Victor (Vic) Stockwell who was Queensland Forestry's ranger responsible for managing timber harvesting in that area. Despite Stockwell's vast experience in forestry he was unable to identify the trees from the photos, and so the two men ventured on foot into the forest to find them. When they encountered the trees, Stockwell realised that this was a species unknown both to himself and to botany in general.

Stockwell was surprised to discover a tree (especially a tree so massive, and growing close to forestry roads) of which he was unaware. It quickly aroused interest in botanical circles and became known colloquially as "Vic Stockwell's Puzzle", and was even mentioned in a scientific paper as Stockwellia long before a formal description and name was published.

Distribution and habitat
This species is endemic to a very small part of the luxuriant Wet Tropics rainforests of north-eastern Queensland, specifically an area on the western slopes of Mount Bartle Frere where it is found only in well-developed rainforest.

Taxonomy
The genus Stockwellia and the species S. quadrifida were first formally described in 2002, some thirty years after its discovery. The Australian botanists Denis John Carr, Maisie Carr and Bernard Hyland published their collaboration in the Botanical Journal of the Linnean Society, based on material collected by Hyland.

Phylogeny
Genetic studies have shown that Stockwellia belongs in the "Eucalyptopsis alliance" (along with the genera Eucalyptopsis and Allosyncarpa) and that Allosyncarpa is basal to this group while the other two are sister taxa. The closest relatives, therefore, are Eucalyptopsis alauda and Eucalyptopsis papuana  (both from New Guinea and the only two species in the genus), and Allosyncarpia ternata (another monotypic genus) from the Northern Territory.

Etymology
The genus name is in honour of Vic Stockwell, being the first to identify the plant as an unknown species. The species epithet quadrifida is derived from the Latin quattuor (four), and -fidus (divided), referring to the four segments of the hypanthium.

Conservation status
This species is listed by the Queensland Department of Environment and Science as vulnerable. , it has not been assessed by the IUCN.

In the 2002 paper that formally describes S. quadrifida, the authors stated that despite its restricted range the only threat to the species is predation of the seeds by Sulphur-crested cockatoos (Cacatua galerita). However a new threat has recently appeared that may be of concern. The Australian botanist Andrew Thornhill wrote in an informal (i.e. not peer reviewed) article in The Conversation that he and fellow botanist Stuart Worboys recently visited these trees, at which time Sworboys observed evidence of the fungus myrtle rust on the leaves. Thornhill wrote: suggesting that the status of this newly discovered species may change in the future.

Ecology
The seeds are eaten by sulphur-crested cockatoos.

References

Notes

External links 

 View a map of historical sightings of this species at the Australasian Virtual Herbarium
 View observations of this species on iNaturalist
 View images of this species on Flickriver
 Photographs by Don Franklin, Jan 2013.

Myrtaceae
Monotypic Myrtaceae genera
Endemic flora of Queensland
Taxa named by Maisie Carr
Taxa named by Bernard Hyland